José Luis Pochettino (born July 29, 1965 in Las Perdices, Córdoba) is a retired Argentine footballer, who played as a striker.

Football career
During his early career, Pochettino played for hometown's Talleres de Córdoba. In 1991, aged 26, he had his first and only abroad experience, with Mexico's Cobras de Ciudad Juárez, returning after one year to his country and joining Deportivo Español, after an unsuccessful trial with Dundee United in Scotland.

In 1994, and during the following four years, Pochettino played one season apiece with second division outfits - the highest professional competition he knew in his country - Club Atlético Douglas Haig, Club Atlético Tigre, Sportivo Italiano and Club Atlético Aldosivi, retiring at the age of 33.

External links
 José Luis Pochettino at BDFA.com.ar 

1965 births
Living people
Argentine footballers
Association football forwards
Talleres de Córdoba footballers
Deportivo Español footballers
Club Atlético Tigre footballers
Aldosivi footballers
Dundee United F.C. players
Argentine expatriate footballers
Argentine expatriate sportspeople in Mexico
Expatriate footballers in Mexico
Expatriate footballers in Scotland
Liga MX players
Scottish Football League players
Sportspeople from Córdoba Province, Argentina